Samuel Casey may refer to:
 Samuel Casey (silversmith) (1723/4–1773), silversmith from Rhode Island
 Samuel Casey (Upper Canada politician) (1788–1857), political figure in Upper Canada
 Samuel L. Casey (1821–1902), U.S. Representative from Kentucky
 Samuel K. Casey (1817–1871), American politician
 Samuel B. Casey, Jr. (1927–2006), president of Pullman Company